American whiskey is whiskey (a distilled beverage produced from a fermented mash of cereal grain) produced in the United States. American whiskeys made from mashes with at least 51% of their named grains include  bourbon whiskey, rye whiskey, rye malt whiskey, malt whiskey, wheat whiskey, Tennessee whiskey, and corn whiskey. 

Other American whiskeys - which do not specify a dominant grain - include  blended whiskeys, blends of straight whiskeys, grain whiskeys, and spirit whiskeys. In the case of blends, American whiskeys may include artificial colors and flavorings. Laws regulating the above products vary between those produced for sale in the U.S. and those exported abroad.

Regulations
The production and labeling of American whiskey is governed by Title 27 of the U.S. Code of Federal Regulations. Outside of the U.S., various other countries recognize certain types of American whiskey, such as bourbon and Tennessee whiskey, as indigenous products of the U.S. that must be produced (although not necessarily bottled) in the U.S. When sold in another country, American whiskey may also be required to conform to local product requirements that apply to whiskey in general when sold in that country. In some cases, this may involve stricter standards than U.S. law.

Canadian law requires that products labeled as bourbon or Tennessee whiskey must satisfy the laws of the U.S. that regulate its manufacture "for consumption in the United States". Some other countries do not specify this requirement. This distinction can be important, as U.S. regulations include substantial exemptions for products that are made for export rather than for consumption within the U.S.

Types 
Some key types of American whiskey listed in the U.S. Code of Federal Regulations include:
 Rye whiskey, made from mash that consists of at least 51% rye
 Rye malt whiskey, made from mash that consists of at least 51% malted rye
 Malt whiskey, made from mash that consists of at least 51% malted barley
 Wheat whiskey, made from mash that consists of at least 51% wheat
 Bourbon whiskey, made from mash that consists of at least 51% corn (maize)
 Corn whiskey, made from mash that consists of at least 80% corn

To be labeled as one of these types, the whiskey must be distilled to no more than 80% alcohol by volume (160 U.S. proof) to ensure the flavor of the original mash is adequately retained, and the addition of coloring, caramel, or other flavoring additives is prohibited. All of these, except corn whiskey, must be aged at least briefly (although no minimum aging period is specified) in charred new oak containers. These restrictions do not exist for some similarly named products in some other countries, such as Canada. American corn whiskey does not have to be aged at all – but, if it is aged, it must be aged in used or uncharred oak barrels "at not more than 62.5% alcohol by volume (125 proof)". In practice, if corn whiskey is aged, it is usually aged in used bourbon barrels.

Straight whiskey is whiskey that was distilled to not more than 80% alcohol by volume (160 proof) that has been aged for at least two years at a starting alcohol concentration of not more than 62.5%. It has not been blended with any other spirits, colorings, or additives. A straight whiskey that also meets one of the other above definitions is referred to by combining the term "straight" with the term for the type of whiskey. For example, a rye whiskey that meets this definition is called a "straight rye whiskey".

Unqualified "whiskey" without a grain type identification such as "bourbon", "rye", or "corn" must be distilled at less than 95% alcohol by volume (190 proof) from a fermented mash of grain in such a manner that the distillate possesses the taste, aroma, and characteristics generally attributed to whiskey. It must be stored in oak containers – charred new oak is not required – and bottled at no less than 40% alcohol by volume (80 proof). To carry the designation "straight whiskey" without a grain type identification, the fermented mash must be less than 51% of any one type of grain and must be stored for a period of at least two years in charred new oak containers.

A straight whiskey that has been aged less than four years must be labeled with an age statement describing the actual minimum age of the product; whereas, if straight whiskey is stored as prescribed for four years or more, a statement of age is optional.

Furthermore, a straight whiskey (or other spirit produced from a single class of materials) may be labeled as bottled in bond if it has been aged for at least four years in a federally bonded warehouse, is bottled at 50% alcohol by volume (100 proof), and is the product of one distilling season (defined as either the first or last half of a calendar year).

Other types of American whiskey defined by federal regulations include the following:
 Blended whiskey is a mixture that contains straight whiskey or a blend of straight whiskeys containing not less than 20 percent straight whiskey (on a proof gallon basis) and, separately or in combination, other whiskey or neutral spirits. For the blended whiskey to be labeled with a particular grain type (i.e., blended rye, malt, wheat, or bourbon whiskey), at least 51% of the blend must be straight whiskey of that grain type. The part of the content that is not straight whiskey may include unaged grain distillates, grain neutral spirits, flavorings, and colorings.
 Blend of straight whiskeys is a mixture of one or more straight whiskeys that either includes straight whiskeys produced in different U.S. states or coloring and flavoring additives (and possibly other approved "blending materials") or both, but does not contain grain neutral spirits.
 Light whiskey is produced in the United States at more than 80% alcohol by volume and stored in used or uncharred new oak containers.
 Spirit whiskey is a mixture of neutral spirits and at least 5% of certain stricter categories of whiskey.

However, it is important to note that these various labeling requirements and "standards of identity" do not apply to products for export from the U.S. (under C.F.R. Title 27, § 5.1). Thus, exported American whiskey may not meet the same labeling standards when sold in some markets.

Another important American whiskey labeling is Tennessee whiskey. This is a recognized name defined under the North American Free Trade Agreement (NAFTA), at least one other international trade agreement, and the law of Canada as a straight bourbon whiskey lawfully produced in the state of Tennessee. Tennessee whiskey production is also governed by Tennessee law. Tennessee House Bill 1084 was passed in 2013 for products produced in the state labeled as "Tennessee Whiskey". It included the existing requirements for bourbon and further required use of the Lincoln County Process for filtering the whiskey through a thick layer of maple charcoal before placing it in barrels for aging, with an exception grandfathered in for Benjamin Prichard's distillery in Kelso, Tennessee, which does not use it. The two major brands of Tennessee whiskey—Jack Daniel's and George Dickel—are both produced using the Lincoln County Process.

History

The taxation of whiskey was a primary test of federal authority early in the history of the United States. Whiskey was the first domestically-produced product to be taxed starting in 1791 (the spirit had yet to overtake rum in production). Resistance to the measure is referred to the Whiskey Rebellion, which lasted through 1794 until put down by federally-called militias.

By the end of the 1800s, the quality of domestic whiskey had generally diminished. The Bottled-in-Bond Act of 1897 was enacted in order to allow for governmental guarantee that whiskey (and other spirits) would be produced to a set of standards for composition and age.

The Temperance Movement forced the closure of several distilleries across the country, culminating in the 1920 enactment of the Eighteenth Amendment and Prohibition. Among other concessions, the U.S. government had provided ten licenses to allow companies to manufacture or provide whiskey for medicinal purposes. Six licenses were ultimately granted to: Brown-Forman, Frankfort Distilleries, the A. Ph. Stitzel Distillery, the American Medicinal Spirits Company, Schenley Industries and James Thompson and Brother. Prohibition's repeal in 1933 spurred several former distillers to rebuild or reestablish their brands.

See also

 Outline of whisky
 American Whiskey Trail
 Moonshine (home-distilled alcohol)
 List of cocktails made with whiskey
 List of whisky brands
 Whisky Competitions

References 

 
Whiskey